Vida Milholland (January 17, 1888 – November 29, 1952) was a women's rights activist and the sister of Inez Milholland, one of the leaders of the National Woman's Party.

Personal life 

Vida was born in Brooklyn, New York in 1888. Her father, John Milholland, was a founding member of the National Association for the Advancement of Colored People. She was the younger sister of the famed suffragist leader Inez Milholland. When she was a young woman she was a concert soprano. She had studied at Vassar College where she was known for athletics and drama. When her sister died in 1916 she devoted her time to suffrage work; she went to prison for three days in 1917 where she sang each night for her fellow prisoners.

Suffrage work 

Vida Milholland was an ardent suffragist and an active member of the militant National Woman's Party and a political ally of Alice Paul. Along with her sister Inez, she was also a member of the College Equal Suffrage League of New York State.

Milholland participated in the picketing of the White House during the first World War in support of women's suffrage. She spent time in Occoquan Workhouse as part of the Silent Sentinels protest. In 1917 Milholland told stories of her imprisonment at the Ritz-Carlton alongside Dora Lewis and others. Alva Belmont presided over this meeting. In 1919 she represented the NWP on their "Prison Special" tour of America where she sang at every meeting.

At a 1921 conference in Washington, D.C. she was honored for her part in the suffrage movement. Vida dressed in a white Crusader's costume the way Inez used to appear at a memorial for her sister in New York in 1924.

Death 

Vida Milholland died in Lewis, Essex County, New York on November 29, 1952 (grave).

References 

1888 births
1952 deaths
American feminists
American suffragists
American women in World War I
People from Brooklyn
American anti-war activists
National Woman's Party activists
Activists from New York (state)
Vassar College